Mattie is a comune (municipality) in the Metropolitan City of Turin in the Italian region Piedmont, located about 45 km west of Turin.

Mattie borders the following municipalities: Bussoleno, Susa, Meana di Susa, Roure, and Fenestrelle.

References

Cities and towns in Piedmont